The 1981 WTA German Open was a women's tennis tournament played on outdoor clay courts at the Rot-Weiss Tennis Club in West Berlin in West Germany that was part of the Toyota Series Category 3 tier of the 1981 WTA Tour. It was the 12th edition of the tournament and was held from 18 May through 24 May 1981. Eighth-seeded Regina Maršíková won the singles title and earned $20,000 first-prize money.

Finals

Singles
 Regina Maršíková defeated  Ivanna Madruga 6–2, 6–1
 It was Maršíková's 1st title of the year and the 17th of her career.

Doubles
 Rosalyn Fairbank /  Tanya Harford defeated  Sue Barker /  Renáta Tomanová 6–3, 6–4

Prize money

References

External links
 ITF tournament edition details

WTA German Open
WTA German Open
1981 in German tennis